The  SVMT Bengaluru–Nagercoil Express, formerly known as  KSR Bengaluru–Nagercoil Express/Bangalore City–Nagercoil Express/Bengaluru City–Nagercoil Express is an Express train belonging to South Coast Railway Zone of the Indian Railways that runs between SVMT Bengaluru in Karnataka and Nagercoil Junction in Tamil Nadu. It is being operated with trains nos. 17235/17236 train numbers on a daily basis. It was initially launched from KSR Bengaluru on 8 February 2014, but from 2 October 2022 it started to run from the newly built SVMT Bengaluru.

Service
17235/SVMT Bengaluru–Nagercoil Express has an average speed of 46 km/hr and covers 670 km in 14h 25m.
17236/Nagercoil–SVMT Bengaluru Express has an average speed of 48 km/hr and covers 670 km in 14h.

CoVID-19 era Special Festival Express 
Passenger train services on Indian Railways stopped temporarily on 22 March 2020 due to CoVID-19 lockdown. Later, when train services where revived, clone/sister trains were introduced with a different number on the same route in a phased manner. In the same way, train no. 07235 KSR Bengaluru-Nagercoil Festival Special and 07236 Nagercoil–KSR Bengaluru Festival Special launched on 31 January 2021 as clone trains for train nos. 17235/17236. This practice was stopped in November 2021 in a phased manner and restored to the pre-pandemic train numbering and fare system.

Route
 Sir M. Visvesvaraya Terminal, Bengaluru
Karmelaram
 Hosur
 Dharmapuri
 Salem Junction
 Rasipuram (Only 17235)
 Namakkal
 Karur Junction
 Dindigul Junction
 Madurai Junction
 Virudhunagar Junction
 Satur
 Kovilpatti
 Tirunelveli Junction
 Valliyur
 Nagercoil Junction

Coach composition
The train has 2 Sitting cum Luggage rakes, 2 Unreserved rakes, 2 AC 2-Tier rakes, 5 AC 3-Tier rakes and 10 Sleeper class rakes (a total of 22 ICF rakes).
 17235 SVMT Bengaluru – Nagercoil Express

 17236 Nagercoil – SMVT Bengaluru Express

Notes

References

External links 

 17235/KSR Bengaluru–Nagercoil Express India Rail Info
 17236/Nagercoil–KSR Bengaluru Express India Rail Info

Transport in Nagercoil
Transport in Bangalore
Express trains in India
Rail transport in Karnataka
Rail transport in Tamil Nadu
Railway services introduced in 2014